Dmitri Nikolaevich Sheremetev (3 January 1803 in Saint Petersburg- 12 September 1871 in Kuskovo) was a Russian aristocratic, member of the Sheremetev family. He was the only son of Nikolai Sheremetev and Praskovia Kovalyova-Zhemchugova and the father of Aleksandr Sheremetev.

Ancestry

External links
Biography

1803 births
1871 deaths
Dmitri